The Crewe and Nantwich Circular Walk is a  long-distance walkers' path in the Cheshire East area of Cheshire, England. As the name suggests, the walk forms a circuit around the towns of Crewe and Nantwich. It is one of two circular walks in the county of Cheshire, the other being the Vale Royal Round. 

The walk is waymarked with a circle with symbols of a leaf, cartwheel and crossed swords. Although mainly on level terrain, the many stiles make the walk unsuitable for people with mobility problems.

Route and sights of interest

The walk is divided into three sections, with sights of interest as follows:

Weston to Acton

Weston
Hough Common
Wybunbury
Mill Bank Farm, with site of medieval watermill
Old Hall Austerson, with 16th-century barn
Shrewbridge Lake, saltwater lake on the outskirts of Nantwich
Dorfold Hall, Jacobean manor house
St Mary's Church, Acton, with tower dating from the 13th century. The churchyard has a 17th-century sundial and almhouses dating from 1613.
Acton village has several buildings dating from the 17th and 18th centuries

Acton to Coppenhall

Henhull, site of Roman road
Reaseheath College
Middlewich branch of the Shropshire Union Canal, with Brickyard Bridge, named after an adjacent brickworks
Moat House Farm, with remains of unusual old moat structure

Coppenhall to Weston

Coppenhall Moss, site of former peat bog, now drained
Sandbach Flashes, series of salt water pools, good for bird-watching
Winterley, former millpond, now home to mute swans
Haslington Hall, Tudor house
Valley Brook, surrounded by old woodland

See also

List of recreational walks in Cheshire

Reference
Cheshire County Council: Crewe and Nantwich Circular Walk Home

Long-distance footpaths in England
Footpaths in Cheshire